Sterne may refer to

Sterne (surname)
Sterne, Laurence (1713 – 1768) author of The Life and Opinions of Tristram Shandy, Gentleman and A Sentimental Journey Through France and Italy.
Sterne, original title of Stars, film directed by Konrad Wolf
Sterne or Die Sterne, band from Germany
Sterne, 1960 Czech film about the assassination of Reinhard Heydrich